The 52nd Infantry Division (52.Infanterie-Division) was a division of the Imperial German Army during World War I. The division was formed on March 6, 1915, from units taken from other divisions or newly raised.  The division was initially mixed, with two infantry regiments from the Grand Duchy of Baden, one infantry regiment from Prussian Saxony, and Prussian and Baden support units (cavalry, artillery, engineers, and service and support units).  While the infantry regiments and the divisional cavalry squadron were regular army units, the rest of the division was made up of reserve units and units formed during the war. The 66th Magdeburg Infantry Regiment was taken from the 7th Infantry Division, and the 169th and 170th Infantry Regiments were taken from Baden's 29th Infantry Division.  The 52nd Infantry Division became more Baden as the war progressed, as the 66th Magdeburg Infantry Regiment, the regiment from Prussian Saxony, was replaced on April 6, 1917, by Baden's 111th Infantry Regiment "Margrave Ludwig Wilhelm".

Shortly after its formation, the division went into the line facing the British Army near Arras, France, on the Western Front.  In 1916, the division fought in the Battle of the Somme.  The division remained on the Western Front for the duration of the war, although it moved to various sectors.  Allied intelligence rated it one of the best German divisions.

Order of battle on March 6, 1915
 104. Infanterie-Brigade
 3. Magdeburgisches Infanterie-Regiment Nr. 66
 8. Badisches Infanterie-Regiment Nr. 169
 9. Badisches Infanterie-Regiment Nr. 170
 Radfahrer-Kompanie Nr. 52
 4.Eskadron/Ulanen-Regiment Hennigs von Treffenfeld (Altmärkisches) Nr. 16
 52.Feldartillerie-Brigade
 Badisches Feldartillerie-Regiment Nr. 103
 Badisches Feldartillerie-Regiment Nr. 104
 Fußartillerie-Bataillon Nr. 52
 Pionier-Kompanie Nr. 103
 Pionier-Kompanie Nr. 104

Order of battle on February 11, 1918
 104.Infanterie-Brigade
 Infanterie-Regiment Markgraf Ludwig Wilhelm (3. Badisches) Nr. 111
 8. Badisches Infanterie-Regiment Nr. 169
 9. Badisches Infanterie-Regiment Nr. 170
 MG-Scharfschützen-Abteilung Nr. 38
 4.Eskadron/Ulanen-Regiment Hennigs von Treffenfeld (Altmärkisches) Nr. 16
 Artillerie-Kommandeur 52:
 Badisches Feldartillerie-Regiment Nr. 104
 II.Bataillon/Reserve-Fußartillerie-Regiment Nr. 17 (from 15.04.1918)
 Stab Pionier-Bataillon Nr. 137:
 Pionier-Kompanie Nr. 103
 Pionier-Kompanie Nr. 104
 Minenwerfer-Kompanie Nr. 52
 Divisions-Nachrichten-Kommandeur 52

Commanders
 Generalleutnant Karl von Borries (3.3.15 – 25.10.18)
 Generalmajor Eugen Glück (25.10.18 – 12.12.18)
 Generalleutnant Wilhelm Ribbentrop (12.12.18 – 23.1.19)

References
 Hermann Cron, Geschichte des deutschen Heeres im Weltkriege 1914-1918 (Berlin, 1937)
 Histories of Two Hundred and Fifty-One Divisions of the German Army which Participated in the War (1914-1918), compiled from records of Intelligence section of the General Staff, American Expeditionary Forces, at General Headquarters, Chaumont, France 1919, (1920)

Notes

Military units and formations established in 1915
1915 establishments in Germany
Infantry divisions of Germany in World War I
Military units and formations disestablished in 1919